Helen Marguerite Muir-Wood   (1895-16 January 1968) was a British paleontologist and historian of paleontology who spent her career at London's Natural History Museum. She is a recipient of the prestigious Lyell Medal for her contributions to the field.

Biography
Born in Hampstead, England, Helen Marguerite Muir-Wood studied geology at the University of London's Bedford College under Catherine Raisin. In 1919, she took a part-time job at the London Natural History Museum, rising through the ranks of geology assistants to become, in 1955, the first woman appointed Deputy Keeper of Palaeontology for the museum. She officially retired in 1961 but continued to do some work at the museum for another four years.

Muir-Wood was an authority on the shelled marine animals known as brachiopods, especially fossil types found in the British isles, the Middle East, India, and Malaysia. She published extensively on brachiopods and co-authored the section on brachiopods in the 1965 survey Treatise on Invertebrate Paleontology.

In 1930, she was awarded the Lyell Fund by the Geological Society of London, and in 1958 she was honored with the Lyell Medal. On her retirement, she was awarded the Order of the British Empire for her services to the museum.

She died in Hampstead in 1968.

Selected publications

References

Further reading
(Ager, Derek V). "Helen Marguerite Muir-Wood". Proceedings of the Geologists' Association 80:1 (1969) 122–24.
Owen, Ellis F. "Dr. H.M. Muir-Wood". Nature 27:5135 (1968) 1294–95.

1895 births
1968 deaths
British women geologists
20th-century British geologists
Alumni of University College London
Members of the Order of the British Empire
Lyell Medal winners